Sunawarshi is an urban municipality in Morang District of Province No. 1 of Nepal. It is one out of nine urban municipalities of Morang District.

The municipality was formed in March 2017 merging some former VDCs: e.g. Amardaha, Govindapur, Baradanga and Dainiya, also taken 3 wards from Rangeli Municipality.

The municipality is divided into 9 wards and total area of the municipality is 106.4 km2 and the population of the municipality is 50758, according to the census of Nepal in 2011. The sunawarshi Municipality name was given from oldest Sunawarshi Maharajthan.

It is surrounded by Ratuwamai in east, Rangeli and Kanepokhari in west, Pathari Sanischare in north and India in south.

References

External links
 Final District Corrected Last for Rajapatra
 www.sunawarshimun.gov.np

 
Municipalities in Koshi Province
Municipalities in Morang District